Michael Michael Breidenbrücker (born 6 January 1972) is an Austrian entrepreneur, artist and engineer. He is best known as the co-founder of Last.fm, a founder of RjDj and a partner at the venture firm Speedinvest. He has worked with musical artists such as Hans Zimmer, Imogen Heap, Air and Booka Shade. In 2011, he produced Inception The App with Christopher Nolan and Hans Zimmer, which reached number 5 in the US App Store charts. Between 2000 and 2002, he headed the masters programme in interactive digital media at Ravensbourne College of Design and Communication in London. He studied digital art at the University of Applied Arts Vienna with Peter Weibel.

Business ventures

Last.fm 
In 2002, Breidenbrücker co-founded the Internet radio site for streaming music Last.fm Ltd. and managed it as CEO from 2002 until 2005. Using a recommend system called Audioscrobbler, Last.fm records users' different musical tastes and makes recommendations. The site also offers different social networking features, allowing users to share their tastes. In May 2007, the company was acquired by CBS Interactive for US$280 million (UK£140 million). In 2003, Last.fm received an Honorary Mention in the Prix Ars Electronica in the category Net vision.

RjDj 
In 2008, he founded RjDj (Reality Jockey Ltd.), a London-based music technology startup. RjDj produced and distributed a network of mobile applications and sold additional musical content within this network.

Mobile applications created with RjDj:
 RjDj App
 Trippy Replay
 Rj Voyager
 Inception The App
 Dimensions The Game
 Situ
 The Dark Knight Rises Z+

Speedinvest 
In 2011, Breidenbrücker joined the founding team of the Vienna-based venture firm Speedinvest. He was originally in the investment committee of Speedinvest. In the second Speedinvest Fund, he joined the partner team and headed the company builder Speedinvest Studio.

42matters 
In 2012, he joined the team behind the Zurich-based app discover startup 42matters.

Life 
Breidenbrücker was born in Vorarlberg, Austria, and lives there with his wife and children.

References

External links 
Last.fm website
 RjDj company website
 Video from talk at MLOVE conference 2012
 Lovely Books website

Living people
1972 births
Austrian businesspeople
Austrian investors
Academics of Ravensbourne University London